The 1994–1995 international cricket season was from September 1994 to April 1995.

Season overview

September

Australia in Pakistan

October

Wills Triangular Series 1994-95

West Indies in India

Wills World Series 1994–95

Sri Lanka in Zimbabwe

November

England in Australia

New Zealand in South Africa

December

Benson & Hedges World Series 1994-95

Mandela Trophy 1994-95

January

Pakistan in South Africa

West Indies in New Zealand

Pakistan in Zimbabwe

February

New Zealand Centenary Tournament 1994-95

March

South Africa in New Zealand

Australia in the West Indies

Sri Lanka in New Zealand

April

Asia Cup 1994-95

References

1994 in cricket
1995 in cricket